G72 may refer to
 D-amino acid oxidase activator
 G72 Quanzhou–Nanning Expressway